This is a summary of the year 2015 in British music.

Events
5 January – An official statement from Glyndebourne confirms that Danielle De Niese and her husband, Gus Christie, chairman of Glyndebourne Opera, are expecting their first child.
15 January – The nominations for the 2015 Brit Awards are announced, with Ed Sheeran, Sam Smith and George Ezra dominating many of the categories.
22 January – It is announced that BBC Radio 1's annual Big Weekend event this year will be held at Earlham Park, Norwich.
8 February – Sam Smith is the big winner at the 57th Annual Grammy Awards, winning Best New Artist, and Record and Song of the Year for "Stay with Me from the album In the Lonely Hour, which subsequently won Best Vocal Album.
25 February – Ed Sheeran and Paloma Faith win Best British Male and Female Solo Artist at this year's Brit Awards, with x winning Best Album and "Uptown Funk" winning Best Single. Notable moments of the night include Kanye West's controversial performance of "All Day" and Madonna falling off stage during her performance of "Living for Love".
27 February – Disgraced former glam rocker Gary Glitter is sentenced to 16 years in prison after being found guilty of sexual offences with minors dating back between 1975–1980
1 March – Audio streaming became incorporated into the UK Albums Chart.
3 March – The London Symphony Orchestra announces the appointment of Sir Simon Rattle as its next music director, effective September 2017, with an initial contract of 5 years.
7 March – The BBC confirms that Electro Velvet's 1920s inspired song "Still in Love with You" has been chosen to represent the UK at this year's Eurovision Song Contest.
9 March
Sam Smith releases a special remake of their song "Lay Me Down", featuring John Legend, as this year's official Comic Relief single.
English National Opera announces the appointment of Cressida Pollock as interim Chief Executive Officer.
10 March – Sarah Brightman confirms she has been working on a song with Andrew Lloyd Webber that she can perform in space aboard the International Space Station in September.   Brightman subsequently withdraws from the planned flight, citing family commitments. 
11 March
 The BBC Scottish Symphony Orchestra announces the appointment of Thomas Dausgaard as its 11th chief conductor, effective with the 2016–2017 season.
 Simon Halsey is announced as the recipient of the Queen's Medal for Music 2014.
18 March – Julian Lloyd Webber is confirmed as the Principal of Birmingham Conservatoire.
20 May – Ye Yanchen's new work, Septet, to be premiered at St Illtud's Church, Llantwit Major, by soloists from China’s National Centre for the Performing Arts Orchestra.
23 May – The United Kingdom is represented at the Eurovision Song Contest in Vienna, Austria, by Electro Velvet, with the song "Still in Love with You".  They finish 24th out of 27 entries, scoring five points.
12 June – Musicians recognised in the 2015 Birthday Honours include conductor Sir Neville Marriner (Companion of Honour) composers Karl Jenkins and James MacMillan who receive knighthoods, and singers Michael Ball (OBE) and Van Morrison (knighthood)
12–14 June – Download Festival 2015 takes place at Donington Park in Leicestershire. The main stage is headlined by Slipknot, Muse and Kiss, the Zippo encore stage by Black Stone Cherry, Marilyn Manson and Enter Shikari, the Maverick stage by Fightstar, Andrew W.K. and Yellowcard, Jake's Stage by A, Hey! Hello! and Suicidal Tendencies, and the Dog's Bed stage by Tim Vantol and Like a Storm.
21 June – Nadine Koutcher wins the 2015 BBC Cardiff Singer of the World competition.
September – A-level student Jessy McCabe persuades examination board Edexcel to ensure that female composers are in future included in its Music syllabus.
21 September – English National Opera announces the appointments of Harry Brünjes as chairman and confirms Cressida Pollock as CEO for an additional three years.
23 September – Welsh National Opera announces the appointment of Tomáš Hanus as music director for the 2016–2017 season, and of Carlo Rizzi as conductor laureate with immediate effect.
2 October – "Writing's on the Wall" by Sam Smith, the theme for the new James Bond movie Spectre, becomes the first ever Bond theme to reach number 1 in the UK.
23 October – "Hello", the lead single from Adele's third studio album 25, is released to intense global media attention. The album (released 20 November) becomes the fastest selling in UK chart history, ending the year on 2.5 million.
18 November – The Three Choirs Festival announces that Alexis Paterson will take over as chief executive in January 2016.
13 December – Louisa Johnson wins the twelfth series of The X Factor. Reggie 'n' Bollie are named runner-ups, while Ché Chesterman and Lauren Murray finish in third and fourth place respectively.
December – As a result of a campaign led by student Jessy McCabe, exam board Edexcel announces that it has changed its A-level music syllabus to include female composers.

Television series
10 January  
Launch of the fourth series of The Voice UK.
Return of Stars in Their Eyes after nearly ten years off air.
14 February – Peter Sarsfield wins the first revival series of Harry Hill's Stars in Their Eyes, impersonating Frankie Valli.
16 January – Sound of Song, presented by Neil Brand
26 January – Launch of new music based entertainment show, South Side Story.
2 February – Global Radio, the owners of pop music channel Heart TV, are reprimanded by Ofcom after the channel played 72 seconds more than the permitted amount of advertising during one particular hour in October 2014. Global says the incident occurred when a commercial break was pushed to the end of an hour, creating too much advertising time for the following hour.
14 February – Stars in Their Eyes is cancelled again after critical reviews of its revamped format.
7 March – Reginald D. Hunter's Songs of the South begins on BBC Two.
26 May – The BBC announces that its music panel quiz Never Mind the Buzzcocks is to end after 18 years and 28 series.
28 June – Pappano's Classical Voices begins on BBC Four.
29 August – Launch of the twelfth series of The X Factor.
19 December – Jay McGuinness of The Wanted and his dance partner Aliona Vilani win the thirteenth series of Strictly Come Dancing. 
20 December – The Sound of Music Live is broadcast on ITV, starring Kara Tointon and Julian Ovenden.

Publications
Karl Jenkins – Still with the Music

Artists and groups reformed 

 Bay City Rollers
 Black Grape
 The Bluetones
 Busted
 Faithless
 The King Blues
 Lush
 Simply Red
 Supertramp
 We've Got a Fuzzbox and We're Gonna Use It

Groups on hiatus 

 Blur
 The Saturdays

Groups disbanded 

 Does It Offend You, Yeah?
 Heart In Hand
 Flesh for Lulu
 Kingsland Road
 Klaxons
 Motörhead
 Neon Jungle
 Noah and the Whale
 Ph.D
 Rise to Remain
 Stereo Kicks

Classical works
 Eleanor Alberga – Arise, Athena!
Julian Anderson
 In lieblicher Bläue (Violin Concerto)
 Van Gogh Blue
 Richard Ayres – No 48 (In the Night Studio)
 Guy Barker – The Lanterne of Light
 Gerald Barry – The One-Armed Pianist
Sally Beamish – "Be still" (Introit)
 Luke Bedford
 Instability
 Saxophone Quartet
 Fiona Bennett – The New Lady Radnor's Suite
 Judith Bingham
 Ghostly Grace
 Zodiack
 Harrison Birtwistle
 The Cure
 The Silk House Sequences
 Victoria Borisova-Ollas – ... and time is running past midnight ...
 Mark Bowden and Owen Sheers – A Violence of Gifts
 Gary Carpenter – Dadaville
 Pete Churchill – Echoes: A Song of Poland
 James Clapperton – Northern Sky
 Anna Clyne – The Seamstress
 Edward Cowie – Three Spitfire Motets
 Paul Crabtree – O Icarus
 Laurence Crane: Chamber Symphony No 2 ('The Australian')
 Tansy Davies – Re-greening
 Benjamin Ellin – Miyabi – Concerto for Violin and Orchestra
 David Fennessy – Hirta Rounds
 Michael Finnissy – Janne
Peter Fribbins – Violin Concerto
 Alexander Goehr
 Variations (Homage to Haydn), for solo piano
 Seven Impromptus, op 96, for two pianos
 Helen Grime – Concerto for clarinet and trumpet
 Barry Guy – Mr Babbage is Coming to Dinner
 Robin Holloway
 Soldered Schumann
 Silvered Schubert
 Europa and the Bull (tuba concerto)
 Mica Levi – Greezy
 James MacMillan
 A Little Mass
 Symphony No 4
 Colin Matthews and Michael Morpurgo – The Pied Piper of Hamelin
 David Matthews – Symphony No 8
 Melinda Maxwell – FRACTURES: Monk Unpacked
 Christopher Mayo – Supermarine
 Anna Meredith – Smatter Hauler
 Thea Musgrave – Power Play
 Mark Simpson
 Israfel
 The Immortal (text by Melanie Challenger)
 Howard Skempton – The Rime of the Ancient Mariner
 Errollyn Wallen – Rebuttal Blues No 1
 Bertram Wee – Dithyrambs
 Judith Weir – Good Morning, Midnight
 Michael Wolters – Requiem to Let
 Hugh Wood – Epithalamion
 Raymond Yiu – Symphony

Opera
21 May – UK premiere of Gaetano Donizetti's Poliuto at Glyndebourne.
 Charlotte Bray and Amy Rosenthal – Entanglement
 Tansy Davies and Nick Drake – Between Worlds
 Matt Rogers and Sally O'Reilly – The Virtues of Things
 Joby Talbot and Gene Scheer – Everest

Musical theatre

Bend It Like Beckham the Musical, with music by Howard Goodall, lyrics by Charles Hart, and book by Gurinder Chadha and Paul Mayeda Berges 
School of Rock, with music by Andrew Lloyd Webber and book by Julian Fellowes
The Mirror Never Lies, music by Juan Iglesias, book and lyrics by Joe Giuffre, based on a novel by Barbara Pym

Musical films
Kill Your Friends, starring Nicholas Hoult and Georgia King.
London Road, starring Olivia Colman and Anita Dobson

Film scores and incidental music

Film
Craig Armstrong – Far from the Madding Crowd
Patrick Doyle – Cinderella
George Fenton – Absolutely Anything
Henry Jackman – Kingsman: The Secret Service

Television
Anne Dudley – Poldark
Debbie Wiseman – Wolf Hall

British music awards

Brit Awards
See 2015 Brit Awards

British Composer Awards
 Amateur or Young Performers: Kate Whitley – Alive
 Choral: James Dillon – Stabat Mater dolorosa
 Community or Educational Project: Stuart Hancock – Snapshot Songs
 Contemporary Jazz Composition: Trish Clowes – The Fox, The Parakeet & The Chestnut
 Large Chamber: Sinan Savaskan – Many stares (through semi-nocturnal Zeiss-Blink) – Module 30
 Liturgical: Michael Finnissy – John the Baptist
 Orchestral: Harrison Birtwistle – Responses: Sweet disorder and the carefully careless
 Small Chamber: Julian Anderson – String Quartet No. 2
 Solo or Duo: Michael Finnissy – Beat Generation Ballads
 Sonic Art: Yann Seznec – Currents
 Stage Works: Julian Anderson – Thebans
 Wind Band or Brass Band: Rory Boyle – Muckle Flugga

Charts and sales

Notable events and records
On 10 July 2015, the chart week changed from Sunday–Saturday to Friday–Thursday, with the first chart covering Sunday 5 July to Thursday 9 July. This chart move is to align the chart week with the new Global Release Day (Friday) for music.

Pharrell Williams set an all-time record when "Happy" notched 64 consecutive weeks in the top 75 of the singles chart.

Adele's 25 became the fastest-selling UK album of all time, beating the record previously held by Oasis' Be Here Now in 1997.

Jess Glynne scored three UK number-one singles and two from the previous year, tying here with Cheryl Fernandez-Versini as the British women with the most UK number-one singles.

In December, Justin Bieber's songs "Sorry" and "Love Yourself" claimed the top 2 spots on the singles chart during the same week, marking the first time this was accomplished since Madonna in 1985. "Love Yourself" went on to replace "Sorry" in the top position, making Bieber the first artist since Elvis Presley in 2005 to knock themselves off the top spot.

"Love Yourself" became the first song in the history of the UK Singles Chart to reach number one without an official single release.

Number-one singles
The singles chart includes a proportion for streaming.

Number-one albums
The 'sales' figures since the chart week ending 7 March include a proportion for audio streams.

Number-one compilation albums

Top singles of the year
This chart was published by the Official Charts Company in January 2016 showing sales and streams for the whole of 2015.

Top albums of the year
This chart published by the Official Charts Company on 5 January 2016 shows combined sales for artist albums from sales and streams for the whole of 2015.

Notes:

Deaths
1 January – Matthew Cogley, musician and songwriter (Failsafe), 30
6 January – Lance Percival, actor and singer, 81
22 January – Joan Hinde, trumpet player, 81
27 January – Margot Moir, Scottish-born Australian singer (The Moir Sisters), 55
29 January – Danny McCulloch, 69, bassist (Eric Burdon & The Animals)
12 February – Steve Strange, singer (Visage), 55 (heart attack)
13 February – John McCabe, British composer and pianist, 75
16 February – Gavin Clark, British songwriter and singer with the bands Sunhouse, Clayhill and U.N.K.L.E, 46
22 February – Chris Rainbow, rock singer and musician (The Alan Parsons Project), 68
16 March – Andy Fraser, composer and bassist (Free), 62
21 March – Jackie Trent, singer-songwriter and actress, 74
23 March
Roy Douglas, composer, 107
Lil Chris, singer-songwriter, musician, 24
26 March – John Renbourn, guitarist and songwriter (Pentangle), 70
28 March
Josie Jones, singer (The Mighty Wah!) (death announced on this date)
Ronald Stevenson, composer and pianist, 87
1 April – Dave Ball, musician (Procol Harum), 65
3 April – Andrew Porter, organist, music critic, and opera director, 86
10 April – Ronald Hambleton, English-born Canadian broadcaster and music critic (Toronto Star), 97
13 April – Ronnie Carroll, Northern Irish singer, 80
17 April – Brian Couzens, music industry executive (Chandos Records), 86
6 May – Errol Brown, Jamaican-born British singer (Hot Chocolate), 71
15 May – Ross Dawson, English drummer (Late of the Pier) 
16 May – Flora MacNeil, Scottish Gaelic singer, 86
21 May – Twinkle, British singer-songwriter, 66 (cancer)
28 May – Johnny Keating, Scottish musician, songwriter and arranger, 87
4 June – Allan Fryer, Scottish-born Australian musician (Heaven), 60 (cancer)
5 June – Nick Marsh, singer and musician (Flesh for Lulu), 53 (cancer)
12 June – Ernest Tomlinson, composer, 90
27 June – Chris Squire, bassist (Yes), 67 (acute erythroid leukemia)
29 June – Bruce Rowland, drummer (Fairport Convention), 74
1 July
Val Doonican, Irish-born singer, 88
Edward Greenfield, music critic and broadcaster, 86
13 July – Eric Wrixon (Them, Thin Lizzy), 68
22 July – Eddie Hardin, singer-songwriter and pianist (The Spencer Davis Group and Axis Point), 66
1 August – Cilla Black, singer and presenter, 72
12 August – John Scott, organist and choirmaster, 59
14 August – Jazz Summers, music manager (Scissor Sisters, The Verve, Snow Patrol), 71 (lung cancer)
8 October – Jim Diamond, Scottish singer, songwriter, 64
11 October – Carey Lander, keyboardist, singer (Camera Obscura), 33
13 October – Duncan Druce, English composer and musicologist, 76
28 October – Diane Charlemagne, singer (52nd Street, Urban Cookie Collective), 51 (cancer)
9 November – Andy White, Scottish musician, drummer, 85
11 November – Phil "Philthy Animal" Taylor, drummer (Motörhead), 61
28 November – Wayne Bickerton, songwriter, record producer, and music executive, 74
17 December – Mick Lynch, Irish singer, musician (Stump), 56 (cancer)
28 December
John Bradbury, drummer (The Specials), 62
Guru Josh, techno producer, musician, 51 (suicide)
Ian "Lemmy" Kilmister, singer, songwriter, musician (Motörhead, Hawkwind), 70 (cancer)

See also 
 2015 in British radio
 2015 in British television
 2015 in the United Kingdom
 List of British films of 2015

References 

 
2015